Heracles Almelo is a Dutch professional football club based in Almelo, founded in 1903. The club has won the Dutch national title twice, in 1927 and 1941. Heracles won the Eerste Divisie title during the 2004–05 season, gaining promotion to the Eredivisie for the first time in 28 years. The club remained in the top division for 17 seasons before suffering relegation at the end of the 2021–22 season. In 2012, they reached the KNVB Cup final for the first time in the club's history, losing to PSV in the final. The club's main rival is FC Twente.

History
The club was founded on 3 May 1903 as Heracles, after the demigod son of Zeus. They changed their name on 1 July 1974 to SC Heracles '74 and finally settled on the current name in 1998.

Heracles finished sixth in the Eredivisie during the 2015–16 season, qualifying for the end of season European play-offs. The club first defeated FC Groningen and then FC Utrecht and thus qualified for the first time in club history for European football, starting in the third qualifying round of the 2016–17 UEFA Europa League.

A run of three consecutive losses saw Heracles end the 2021–22 season in sixteenth place, condemning them to the promotion/relegation play-offs. The club were relegated to the Eerste Divisie after losing 6-1 to Excelsior Rotterdam on aggregate in the semifinals.

Stadium
Heracles Almelo currently play at the Erve Asito in Almelo. The Erve Asito was built in 1999 with a capacity 6,900, this was expanded in 2005 to hold 8,500. The pitch at the Erve Asito is artificial turf. After renovation of the stadium at the beginning of 2015–16 season, it currently holds 13,500 spectators.

Honours

National
 Eredivisie
Champions: 1926–27, 1940–41

 Eerste Divisie
Winners: 1984–85, 2004–05

 KNVB Cup
Runners-up: 2011–12

Domestic results
Below is a table with Heracles Almelo's domestic results since the introduction of the Eredivisie in 1956.

European record

Notes
 3Q: Third qualifying round

Current squad

Out on loan

Coaching staff

Former coaches

  Horace Colclough (1920–21)
  Ted Magner (1921–23)
  Horace Colclough (1923–32)
  Robert Roxburgh (1932–35)
  Leslie Lievesley (1 March 1946 – 30 June 1947)
  David Davison (July 1948 – February 1949)
  Gilbert Richmond (1949-53)
  Duggie Lochhead (1953–56)
  Jan Bilj (1956–60)
  Michael Keeping (Sept. 1960 – 30 January 1961)
  Frits van der Elst / Freek Jaarsma (1961 interim)
  Jaap van der Leck (March 1961–63)
  Keith Spurgeon (1 July 1963 – 30 June 1964)
  Jan de Bouter (1964–66)
  Les Talbot (1 July 1966 – 30 June 1967)
  Toon Valks (1967–69)
  Evert Teunissen (1 July 1969 – 30 June 1970)
  Rinus Gosens (1 July 1970 – 30 June 1972)
  Ron Dellow (1 July 1972 – 30 June 1975)
  Jan Verhaert (1975–76)
  Hennie Hollink (1 July 1976 – 30 June 1979)
  Theo Laseroms (1979–81)
  Jan Morsing (1 July 1981 – 3 November 1982)
  Arie Stehouwer (1982–83)
  Gerard Somer (1983–87)
  Jan Morsing (1988)
  Henk van Brussel (1989–90)
  Henk ten Cate (21 November 1990 – 30 June 1992)
  Azing Griever (1 February 1993 – 1 March 1995)
  Jan van Staa (1 July 1995 – 30 June 1996)
  Gerard Marsman (1 July 1996 – 30 June 1998)
  Theo Vonk (8 March 1998 – 30 June 1999)
  Fritz Korbach (1 July 1999 – 30 June 2001)
  Gertjan Verbeek (1 July 2001 – 30 June 2004)
  Peter Bosz (1 July 2004 – 30 June 2006)
  Ruud Brood (1 July 2006 – 24 December 2007)
  Gert Heerkes (2 January 2008 – 30 June 2009)
  Gertjan Verbeek (1 July 2009 – 30 June 2010)
  Peter Bosz (1 July 2010 – 30 June 2013)
  Jan de Jonge (1 July 2013 – 31 August 2014)
  John Stegeman (1 September 2014 – 30 June 2018)
  Frank Wormuth (1 July 2018 – 16 May 2022)

References

External links

 Fansite HAFC.nl 
 Tactical formations at football-lineups.com 

 
Association football clubs established in 1903
1903 establishments in the Netherlands
Football clubs in the Netherlands
Football clubs in Overijssel
Sport in Almelo